Farley Copse is a   Local Nature Reserve  on the western outskirts of Bracknell in Berkshire. It is owned and managed by Bracknell Forest Borough Council.

Geography and site

This site is ancient woodland, and contains a pond.

History

Farley Copse was once part of a large estate belonging to the Edwardian Farley Moor House.

In 2002 the site was declared as a local nature reserve by Bracknell Forest Borough Council.

Fauna

The site has the following fauna:

Mammals

Roe deer
European badger

Invertebrates

Large red damselfly
Stag beetle
Libellula depressa

Birds

Eurasian bullfinch

Flora

The site has the following flora:

Trees

Sequoiadendron giganteum

Plants

Anemone nemorosa
Hyacinthoides non-scripta

References

Local Nature Reserves in Berkshire